HD 198716, also known as HR 7987 or 33 G. Microscopii, is a solitary star located in the southern constellation Microscopium. Eggen (1993) lists it as a member of the Milky Way's old disk population.

The object has an apparent magnitude of 5.33, making it faintly visible to the naked eye under ideal conditions. Based on parallax measurements from the Gaia satellite, it is estimated to be 396 light years away from the Solar System. At its current distance, HD 198716's brightness is diminished by 0.1 magnitude due to interstellar dust.

This is an evolved red giant star with a stellar classification of K2 III. It has 2.45 times the mass of the Sun but at an age of 622 million years, it has expanded to 23.9 times the Sun's radius.

References

K-type giants
High-proper-motion stars
Microscopium
Microscopii, 33
CD-40 14078
198716
103127
7987